The Shell Gas Station on Yosemite Blvd. in La Grange, California was built in 1925 by Shell USA.

It was asserted to be "A rare vernacular example of this architectural type and period" and was described succinctly:Prefabricated tin service station  main building, projecting covered service area and separate restroom unit. Finials decorate the four corners of the flat-roofed service area. Poignantly distinctive restroom unit also prefabricated tin; completely free standing, with rounded lines reflective of nascent Moderne.

References

Gas stations on the National Register of Historic Places in California
National Register of Historic Places in Stanislaus County, California
Moderne architecture in the United States
Buildings and structures completed in 1925
1925 establishments in California
Shell plc buildings and structures